The Westville Dam is located on the Quinebaug River between Southbridge and Sturbridge, about  west of the Southbridge town center and  southwest of Worcester, Massachusetts.

Designed and constructed by the United States Army Corps of Engineers, this dam substantially reduces flooding along the Quinebaug and Thames rivers. Construction of the project began in June 1960 with completion in August 1962 at a cost of US$5.6 million.

The Westville reservoir is located within the Quinebaug River Watershed and is part of the Thames River Basin. Access to the site is available from Interstate 84 and State Route 131.

Description

Located over the outlet channel, the spillway comprises a concrete weir  in length. The weir's crest elevation is  lower than the top of the dam.

Recreation Areas
There is a large picnic/recreation area, with two reserveable picnic shelters located near the south end of the lake. The entrance is on Wallace Road in Sturbridge, near the Quinebaug river bridge. A boat ramp is also located in the recreation area. Camping and swimming are not permitted. There is no entrance fee. The recreation area is open daily during the summer season (3rd Saturday in May to the 2nd Sunday in September) from 8am to 8pm.

A  loop trail, known as the Westville Lake Community trail, circles the lake. It is open to all non-motorized use. It can be accessed from the recreation area, the damsite parking lot, and the Wallace Road trailhead.

The Heritage trail, a walking trail, starts at the damsite and heads north along the river to nearby West Street School.

The Grand Trunk Trail, which follows the grade of the never completed Southern New England Railway, leads  from the recreation area to River Road in Sturbridge. The western half of the Community Trail loop follows this railbed as well. The trails, including the damsite and Wallace Road parking areas, are open year-round from sunrise to sunset.

A canoe launching area and fishing area is located along Old Mashapaug Road west of the recreation area. Canoeists can paddle up the Quinebaug River as far as Turner's Club Field in the village of Fiskdale, approx.  upstream. Old Mashapaug Road is open to vehicles during daylight hours from the opening of fishing season in April to the Sunday after Labor Day.

A 3/4 mile trail is also available in the Hobbs Brook area of the project, with a trailhead off Hall Road in Sturbridge.

References 
Westville Dam, nae.usace.army.mil

Dams in Massachusetts
Buildings and structures in Southbridge, Massachusetts
United States Army Corps of Engineers dams
Dams completed in 1962
Buildings and structures in Sturbridge, Massachusetts